Triple takeoff/landing capabilities are a necessity for many large airports as it allows many aircraft to arrive and depart in a short amount of time. Each country sets its own standards for the separation between runways required for parallel approaches. In the United States, the Federal Aviation Administration dictates that airports must have at least  between runways, though it can grant special permission to conduct parallel approaches with less separation if deemed necessary.

Airports with triple parallel landing capabilities

References

External links
Federal Aviation Administration (FAA): National Plan of Integrated Airport Systems (NPIAS) 2005-2009
FAA National Flight Data Center (NFDC): Airport Data (Form 5010), also available from AirportIQ 5010

Triple takeoff/landing capability